The Women's 15 kilometre classical competition of the 2022 Winter Paralympics was held at the National Biathlon Center in Beijing on 6 and 7 March 2022.

Medal table

15 km classical visually impaired
In the cross-country skiing visually impaired, the athlete with a visual impairment has a sighted guide. The two skiers are considered a team, and dual medals are awarded.

15 km classical standing

15 km sitting

See also
Cross-country skiing at the 2022 Winter Olympics

References

Women's 15 kilometre classical
Para